Broadrick v. Oklahoma, 413 U.S. 601 (1973), is a United States Supreme Court decision upholding an Oklahoma statute which prohibited state employees from engaging in partisan political activities. Broadrick is often cited to enunciate the test for a facial overbreadth challenge that "the overbreadth of a statute must not only be real, but substantial as well, judged in relation to the statute's plainly legitimate sweep."

External links
 

United States Supreme Court cases
United States Supreme Court cases of the Burger Court
United States Free Speech Clause case law
Void for vagueness case law
Overbreadth case law
1973 in United States case law